Lee Nystrom is a former player in the National Football League. He was member of the Green Bay Packers for two seasons, though he did not see any playing time in a regular season game during his first season.

References

1951 births
Living people
People from Worthington, Minnesota
Players of American football from Minnesota
American football centers
Macalester College alumni
Green Bay Packers players